Keckiella ternata is a species of flowering plant in the plantain family known by the common name scarlet keckiella.

It is native to the mountains of southern California and Baja California, where it grows in several local habitat types, including chaparral and woodland.

Description
Keckiella ternata is a shrub often exceeding two meters in height and spreading slightly with wand-like, waxy branches.

The branches bear whorls of three leaves each, or oppositely arranged pairs of leaves. Each toothed, curving leaf is tapered at the base and pointed at the tip, oblong to lance-shaped, and up to 6 centimeters long.

The inflorescence is an array of solid red tubular flowers up to 3 centimeters long. The hairy staminode is visible in the mouth of the flower.

External links
Jepson Manual Treatment of Keckiella ternata
Keckiella ternata — UC Photos gallery

ternata
Flora of Baja California
Flora of California
Natural history of the California chaparral and woodlands
Natural history of the Peninsular Ranges
Natural history of the Santa Monica Mountains
Natural history of the Transverse Ranges
Flora without expected TNC conservation status